Nicholas Quinn (born 1993) is an Irish swimmer.

Nicholas Quinn may also refer to:

 Nicholas Quinn, the title character in The Silent World of Nicholas Quinn
 Nicholas Quinn, a character in High Stakes
 Nick Quinn, a character in Attorney for the Defense

See also
 Nicholas Quinn Rosenkranz (born 1970), American Constitutional law scholar and Broadway producer